The Jade Solid Gold Best Ten Music Awards Presentation was held at the Hong Kong Coliseum.  

A mistake was  made by the hosts of the show in announcing the award for Hins Cheung, which was incorrectly given to Ivana Wong. They agreed to share the prizes.

Top 10 song awards
The top 10 songs (十大勁歌金曲) of 2007 are as follows.

Additional awards

Notes

References
 Top ten songs award 2007, Tvcity.tvb.com
 Additional awards 2007, Tvcity.tvb.com
 Sing Tao Daily Entertainment section. 13 January 2008 Section C1.

Cantopop
Jade Solid Gold Best Ten Music Awards Presentation, 2007